La Perrièremay refer to two communes of France:
 La Perrière, Orne, in the region of Basse-Normandie
 La Perrière, Savoie, in the region of Rhône-Alpes
 Ian Laperriere, Canadian ice hockey player
 Guillaume de La Perrière (1499/1503 – 1565), French writer